The Coquitlam Reds are a youth baseball team located in the city of Coquitlam, British Columbia. The team was founded in 1977, and joined the B.C. Premier Baseball League in 1999.

Bill Green has been the manager of the Reds since 1985, and is a member of the Major League Baseball Scouting Bureau. The team plays their home games at Mundy Park.

The Reds' most famous alumnus is former Major League All-Star and National League MVP Larry Walker. In a 2013 interview with the Vancouver Province, Walker discussed his time with the Reds:

I think it got me prepared for what I was getting into. It’s quite a few years ago now, but I believe we were playing like 65 games and that was a big deal back then. It got me prepared for doing a cannonball into the world of pro baseball."

More recent Reds players include third baseman Shawn Bowman (drafted by the New York Mets in 2002), Matt Rogelstad (signed by the Seattle Mariners in 2003), outfielder Rene Tosoni (drafted by the Minnesota Twins in 2005), and pitcher Curtis Taylor (drafted by the Arizona Diamondbacks in 2016).

References

External links
 Official Website
 Coquitlam Reds page on BCPBL website

Sport in Coquitlam
Baseball teams in British Columbia
Amateur baseball teams in Canada
Baseball teams established in 1977
1977 establishments in British Columbia